Ohio's 6th congressional district is represented by Representative Bill Johnson (R-OH). This district runs along the eastern side of the state, bordering West Virginia, and Pennsylvania.  It stretches from Marietta through several Ohio River industrial towns all the way to the city of Youngstown.

History 
When Robert McEwen was first elected in 1980, the Sixth District of Ohio consisted of Adams, Brown, Clinton, Fayette, Highland, Pickaway, Pike, Scioto, and Ross Counties plus Clermont County outside the city of Loveland, Harrison Township in Vinton County and the Warren County townships of Clearcreek, Deerfield, Hamilton, Harlan, Massie, Salem, and Wayne. At that time, The Washington Post described the Sixth as "a fail-safe Republican district."

The Ohio General Assembly redrew the Sixth District following the results of the 1980 Census.  The boundaries from 1983 to 1987 included all of Adams, Clinton, Fayette, Highland, Hocking, Jackson, Pike, Ross, Scioto, Vinton and Warren Counties, plus Waterloo and York Townships in Athens County; Wayne Township in Clermont County; Concord, Jasper, Marion, Perry, Union, and Wayne Townships in Fayette County; and Washington Township and the Cities of Miamisburg and West Carrollton in Montgomery County.

Beginning with the 100th Congress in 1987, adjustments were made by the legislature to the boundaries;  reapportionment between censuses is unusual in American politics.  A small part of the Montgomery County territory was detached, as were parts of Fayette County in Washington Court House in Union Township and the townships of Jasper and Marion. Part of Brown County was added, Jackson and Eagle Townships.  These were the boundaries for the rest of McEwen's service in Congress.

The district was largely rural and agricultural with no large cities. One of the major industries was the United States Department of Energy's Portsmouth Gaseous Diffusion Plant at Piketon, which manufactured uranium for nuclear weapons. The district was 97 per cent white with a median household income of $21,761.

In 1992, the district was altered significantly to accommodate Ohio's loss of two House seats in redistricting.  The state legislature anticipated that Clarence Miller of the neighboring Tenth District would retire, and thus combined the southern end of his district (which included Athens, Gallipolis, and Ironton) with most of the area previously represented by McEwen.  Although the district did not include Miller's hometown of Lancaster, Miller decided not to retire and instead challenged McEwen in the Sixth District primary in 1992.  The campaign was bitter, and McEwen eked out only a narrow victory. In November, McEwen was upset by Democrat Ted Strickland, a prison psychologist.  Strickland himself was defeated in 1994 by Republican Frank Cremeans, but won the seat back in 1996.

For 2002 the district was shifted dramatically eastward. At the same time, it effectively ended the career of James Traficant in the neighboring 17th District by placing his hometown of Poland into the 6th. Traficant opted to run in his old district and lost.  The district currently includes all of Belmont, Carroll, Columbiana, Gallia, Guernsey, Jackson, Jefferson, Lawrence, Meigs, Monroe, Noble and Washington counties, and portions of Athens, Mahoning, Muskingum, Scioto and Tuscarawas counties.

In 2010, Republican Bill Johnson defeated incumbent Democrat Charles Wilson, returning the seat Republican for the first time since 1997. Following the 2010 United States Census, the bounds of the sixth district were changed again as Ohio lost two seats in Congress.

In recent years and like much of coal country, the district has swung decidedly toward the Republican Party at local, state and national levels. After being a dead heat in presidential elections in 2000, 2004 and 2008, it swung hard to Donald Trump in 2016; Trump carried it with 69 percent of the vote over Hillary Clinton, his best showing in the state; the district swung to the right by 30 percent, more than any other in the nation. Trump won it almost as easily over Joe Biden in 2020, with 72 percent of the vote, again his best showing in Ohio.

List of members representing the district

Recent election results 
The following chart shows historic election results.

Competitiveness
Election results from presidential races:

Historical district boundaries

See also
Ohio's congressional districts
List of United States congressional districts

Notes

References

Sources

 Congressional Biographical Directory of the United States 1774–present

06
Constituencies established in 1813
1813 establishments in Ohio